Somerset is a census-designated place (CDP) and post office located in and governed by Gunnison County, Colorado, United States. The Somerset post office has the ZIP Code 81434. At the United States Census 2010, the population of the 81434 ZIP Code Tabulation Area was 158.

History

Somerset was named after Somerset, Pennsylvania.

In 2012, the Aspen Skiing Company built a 3-megawatt methane-to-electricity plant in Somerset at Oxbow Carbon's Elk Creek Mine.

Geography

Demographics

See also

 List of census designated places in Colorado

References

External links

 Somerset @ Colorado.com
 Somerset @ UncoverColorado.com
 Somerset, Colorado Mining Claims And Mines
 Gunnison County website

Census-designated places in Gunnison County, Colorado
Census-designated places in Colorado